Loco Mountain, el.  is a mountain peak on the eastern face of the Crazy Mountains in Meagher County, Montana.  It is located within the Lewis and Clark National Forest.

See also
 Mountains in Meagher County, Montana

Notes

Mountains of Montana
Landforms of Meagher County, Montana